The Ardour is a  long river flowing in the departments of the Creuse and Haute-Vienne, in the Nouvelle-Aquitaine region of France. The river is a tributary of the Gartempe, and so a sub-tributary of the Loire. It flows into the Gartempe near Bersac-sur-Rivalier.

References

Rivers of Haute-Vienne
Rivers of Creuse
Rivers of Nouvelle-Aquitaine
Rivers of France